Stony Hill is an unincorporated community in Wake County, North Carolina, United States at an elevation of 407 feet or 124 m. The center of the community is at the intersection of North Carolina Highway 98 and Stony Hill Road. There is a fire station further north on Stony Hill Road.

References
 

Unincorporated communities in Wake County, North Carolina
Unincorporated communities in North Carolina
Populated places on the Neuse River